Yeongam-eup (영암읍) is the county seat of Yeongam County, South Jeolla province, South Korea.  It was elevated from myeon to eup in 1979.

There is a population of 10,724 from 3,697 households.

External links
 Yeongam-eup website, in Korean
 County government home page
 Yeongam Tourist Cyber Town

Towns and townships in South Jeolla Province
Yeongam County